The Rowland Theater (alternately spelled Theatre), located at 127 North Front Street, Philipsburg, Centre County, Pennsylvania, United States, is an historic single screen movie theater, built in 1917 by Charles Hedding Rowland. The theater is owned by the borough of Phillipsburg.

History 
The site of the Rowland Theatre building was previously occupied by the Pierce Opera House. Owned by Philipsburg business man J.H. Pierce and built sometime before 1889, this three story building was destroyed by fire, along with several other downtown buildings, on December 30, 1910. Then the Rowland family purchased the Opera House property on December 31, 1915, and immediately began making plans for the construction of a building which could house live theatrical performances as well as conventions and public meetings. The theatre is currently owned by Philipsburg Borough and leased to Rowland Theatre, Inc. a 501(c)3 non-profit.  It was added to the National Register of Historic Places in 1979.  It is located in the Philipsburg Historic District.

Charles Hedding Rowland 
U.S. Congressman Charles Hedding Rowland, born December 20, 1860, was one of several enterprising businessmen who engaged in coal mining operations in the Philipsburg Area. He was president of both the Moshannon Coal Mining Company and the Pittsburg and Susquehanna Railroad Companies during the late 19th century. He was later elected as a representative of the Republican Party to the 64th and 65th Congress. His terms of office as a U.S. Congressman began in March, 1915, and ended in March, 1919. He declined a re-nomination in 1918, serving out his remaining term before retiring.

Construction 
Construction then was carried out under the direction of architect Julian Millard, designer, with W. A. Hoyt, serving as the construction engineer. Planning began in 1915, with construction starting in 1916, and completed in mid 1917

After completion of the construction of the theater, Rowland released this statement in a brochure distributed to the public on opening night in June, 1917:

“The people of Philipsburg have long indulged the hope of a comfortable and commodious place of amusement and entertainment. For years we have had no suitable place for public meetings, entertaining conventions, or any auditorium large enough for the varied necessities of a community as large as ours. Such a building is a public necessity. The town needs it in order to keep pace with  sister communities. Community growth would be retarded without such a public convenience.

"I have felt that we should have a theatre building in Philipsburg of size, safety and perfection of appointment that would anticipate the future, maintain our best past traditions, reflect a progressive spirit, while affording us a place to spend a delightful evening at home. It is proposed to stage only plays and moving pictures of class and quality. I trust the people of Philipsburg, together with those who come from surrounding towns, may enjoy the playhouse now dedicated to their use and pleasure. I wish to take this occasion to say to the theatre going public that it has been a source of some gratification to have been the one permitted to open to the general public a place for its comfort and entertainment.”

Architecture 
The building itself is a brick and ferro-concrete structure measuring sixty-six by two-hundred-twenty-two feet in plan. The first story of the front part of the building contains the theatre's entrance way, outer lobby, and two commercial stores. A suite of offices is found on the second floor and a meeting/rehearsal hall and miscellaneous rooms are on the third floor. The second and third floors are not currently used, as they do not comply with modern fire codes in providing adequate fire exits.

Façade 
As a whole, the façade is a symmetrical composition with classically inspired detailing. Despite the volumetric effects of the projecting marquee, recessed theatre and shop entrances, and bracketed cornice, the image is predominantly two-dimensional. However, the use of decorative patterns in the brickwork, contrasting color and texture of materials, and architecture ornamentation contribute to a masterful composition. Horizontal emphasis is provided by simple, bold lintels about the store fronts, a belt course at the base of the third story windows, a projecting cornice, and caps which line the top of the parapet wall. Vertical emphasis is given by the effect of pilasters defining the three bays of the first and second stories. A rectangular concrete plaque inscribed with the word “THEATRE” and the marquee/theatre entrance defines a central axis.

Lobby and Foyer 
The lobby of the Rowland theater houses the current box office and concessions, as well as the original box office, now used for minor storage. It features plate marble on the lower half of the walls, and murals depicting both Native American and local historical scenes on the upper halves. Lighting is provided by two large hanging fixtures.

The foyer is large, expansive, and lavishly decorated. It features a stained glass skylight, crimson red carpet, marble plate lower walls and ornate cloth hangings on the upper walls. Two staircases, one on each side wall, lead upstairs, converging at the entrances of the main office and board room, and ending in a ramp up to the balcony. The restrooms are also located here, as well as storage for some concession supplies.

Main Hall 
The main hall of the Rowland theater houses the majority of seating available. Approximately 1000 seats, as well as handicap-accessible areas, adorn the main floor up to the edge of the orchestra pit. The ceiling is vaulted where it meets with the steel support structure (a successful attempt to blend form and function, adding to the appealing look of the building), and once contained various ornate murals, which have since been mostly covered by white paint during restoration. Some original parts of the mural, as well as examples of restoration efforts conducted in 1930, have been left exposed.

The frame of the stage is ornately decorated, and once featured similar murals to the ceiling (some examples are left exposed here as well). Still visible are original, hand-carved wood accents over the doors leading up to the stage's side areas.

Balcony 
Only 18 and older unless with an adult. Decent love cushion seats.

Stage and Screen 
The stage in the theater is fifty feet in width, thirty-four feet deep, and has approximately 50 feet of vertical space, with eleven dressing rooms in the basement below. The front curtains are motor driven, and three additional layers of curtains run to the back wall of the stage, giving it multiple depth options for stage productions.

The screen is the largest movie screen in central Pennsylvania, measuring 29 feet wide and 15 feet tall. It can be converted to handle both Flat and Scope aspect films. It is suspended from the stage ceiling, and can be raised and lowered via a pulley system located offstage to allow for quick transition between motion picture and stage events.

Projection and Sound Systems 
The Rowland Theater uses a three-tier platter system coupled with a 35mm projector. The projector itself supports both Flat and Scope aspect films via interchangeable lenses.

Sound is provided by a Dolby SR Processor. Speakers are located on stage behind the screen (center, left and right channels), in the Orchestra Pit (subwoofer), and along the sides of the theater walls (surround channels) on both the ground floor and balcony.

Operation 
The Rowland Theater is currently owned by Philipsburg Borough and run by the non-profit Rowland Theater, Inc. Its governing body consists of a volunteer Board of Directors, and it employs approximately eight full-time employees (management. projection, and cleaning staffs). Concessions and other jobs are staffed by volunteers from the local community, and volunteer hours can be used as credit towards a variety of local programs which have community service requirements.

Seating 
The theater can accommodate approximately 1150 people total, and approximately 950 during normal operation. This is due to the seats in the back portion of the balcony being originals, and therefore off-limits to the general public. They can be opened when needed, but this hasn't happened during modern operation.

Ticket Prices 
Prices for movies shown at the Rowland remain among the lowest in the United States. Ticket prices are as follows:
$6 - Adult 12+
$5 - Children 4-11, Seniors 55+
Free - Children 3 and younger

Stage Productions 
The theater's stage can be used for a variety of events, including plays, choirs, and smaller orchestras. In front of the stage is an orchestra pit which can hold approximately 30 musicians and instruments. Minimal on-stage lighting and several spotlights, located throughout the theater's main hall, are available. A house sound system, separate from the system used for motion pictures, is also available.

References

External links 
The Rowland Theater - Official Website
The Rowland Theater - Cinema Treasures Listing
Rowland Theater offers a touch of glamour - Article from the Centre Daily Times

Theatres on the National Register of Historic Places in Pennsylvania
Cinemas and movie theaters in Pennsylvania
Theatres completed in 1917
Buildings and structures in Centre County, Pennsylvania
Tourist attractions in Centre County, Pennsylvania
National Register of Historic Places in Centre County, Pennsylvania